This is a list of schools in Charleston, South Carolina.

Elementary schools
Angel Oak Elementary School
Ashley River Elementary School
Buist Academy - CCSD
Cane Bay Elementary School
Charles Pinckney Elementary School - CCSD
Charleston Dev. Academy
Charleston Progressive
Charlestowne Academy
Drayton Hall Elementary School
E.B. Ellington Elementary School
Fraser Elementary School
Harbor View Elementary School
James Island Elementary School - CCSD
James Simons Elementary School
Memminger Elementary School - CCSD
Minnie Hughes Elementary School
Mitchell Elementary School
Montessori Program
Mt. Zion Elementary School
Murray-LaSaine Elementary School
Orange Grove Elementary School
Pepperhill Elementary School
Sanders-Clyde Elementary School
St. Andrews
St. James-Santee - CCSD
Springfield Elementary School
Stiles Point Elementary School
Stono Park Elementary School
West Ashley Int

Middle schools
Buist Academy  - CCSD
C.E. Williams Middle School
Charleston Charter School for Math & Science
Charleston Progressive
Charlestowne Academy
Discipline School
Fort Johnson Middle School
Haut Gap Middle School
James Island Middle School
Moultrie Middle School - CCSD
Palmetto Scholars Academy
West Ashley Middle School - CCSD

High schools
Allegro Charter School of Music
Burke High School
Charleston Charter for Math and Science
Charleston County School of the Arts
James Island Charter High School/IB at JICHS
Wando High School
West Ashley High School - CCSD

Private schools
 Addlestone Hebrew Academy (PK-8)
 Ashley Hall (PK-12)
 Bishop England High School (9-12) - Diocese of Charleston
 Blessed Sacrament (6-8) - Diocese of Charleston
 The Charleston Catholic School (K-8)
 Charleston Day School (K-8)
 First Baptist Church School (PK-12)
 James Island Christian School (K-12)
 Mason Preparatory School (K-8)
 Nativity School (PK-8)
 Porter-Gaud School (PK-12)

Higher education
The American College of the Building Arts
The Citadel
College of Charleston
Charleston School of Law
Medical University of South Carolina
Charleston Southern University
Roper Hospital School of Practical Nursing
Trident Technical College, small satellite campus

Former schools

 Industrial Training School of Charleston, also called Colored School of Charleston

References

Education in Charleston, South Carolina
Charleston